"Your Love Had Taken Me That High" is a song written by Jack Dunham and Galen Raye, and recorded by American country music artist Conway Twitty.  It was released in November 1978 as the second single from his album, Conway.  The song peaked at No. 3 on the Billboard Hot Country Singles chart. It also reached No. 1 on the RPM Country Tracks chart in Canada.

Charts

Weekly charts

Year-end charts

References

1979 singles
Conway Twitty songs
Song recordings produced by Owen Bradley
MCA Records singles
1978 songs